A. J. McKee (born April 7, 1995) is an American mixed martial artist currently competing in Bellator's Featherweight and Lightweight division, where he is the former Bellator Featherweight Champion. As of March 14, 2023, he is #4 in the Bellator men's pound-for-pound rankings, #3 in the Bellator Featherweight Rankings, and #6 in the Bellator Lightweight Rankings.

Background
The son of former mixed martial artist Antonio McKee and Michelle George, A. J. was born and raised in Long Beach, California. A. J. graduated from Long Beach Polytechnic High School where he joined the wrestling team. He went on to attend both Notre Dame College and Cerritos College.

Mixed martial arts career

Early career
McKee went 7–1 as an amateur from 2012 to 2014, before turning professional in 2015. He is coached by his father Antonio McKee and currently trains out of Body Shop Fitness, with the likes of Bubba Jenkins and Emanuel Newton.

Bellator MMA

2015
In his professional mixed martial arts and promotional debut, McKee faced Marcos Bonilla at Bellator 136 on April 10, 2015. He won the fight via rear-naked choke submission in the first round.

McKee next faced James Barnes at Bellator 141 on August 28, 2015. As Barnes' back was against the cage, McKee landed a hard left hand, resulting in a knockout victory for McKee at 1:42 in the first round.

McKee faced J.T. Donaldson at Bellator 147 on December 4, 2015. He secured his third first-round finish, after a knee and follow-up punches to his hurt opponent prompted a stoppage.

In December 2015, the promotion announced that McKee had signed a multi-year contract extension.

2016
McKee faced Danilo Belluardo at Bellator 152 on April 16, 2016. He won the fight via TKO in the first round.

McKee was next scheduled to face Henry Corrales at Bellator 160 on August 26, 2016. However, Corrales withdrew from the bout due to an injury and was replaced by Cody Walker. He won the fight via submission in the second round.

For his third fight in 2016, McKee was scheduled to face a two-time title contender Emmanuel Sanchez at Bellator 166 on December 2, 2016. However, Sanchez withdrew from the bout due to an injury and was replaced by Ray Wood. He won the fight via unanimous decision.

2017
McKee faced Brandon Phillips at Bellator 171 on January 27, 2017. He won the fight via unanimous decision.

McKee faced Dominic Mazzotta at Bellator 178 on April 21, 2017. He won the fight via knockout due to a head kick just 75 seconds into the first round.

McKee faced Blair Tugman at Bellator 182 on August 25, 2017. He won via unanimous decision and in the process tied the record with Ben Askren and Michael Chandler for the most consecutive wins in Bellator history.

McKee was expected to face Jeremy Petley at Bellator 187 on November 10, 2017. However, after the withdrawal of James Gallagher as a result of an injury, McKee's opponent was changed to Brian Moore. He won the fight via submission in the third round.

2018
McKee faced former UFC competitor Justin Lawrence at Bellator 197 on April 13, 2018. He won the fight via unanimous decision.

At Bellator 205 McKee was expected to headline opposite former featherweight champion Pat Curran. The event took place in Boise, Idaho on September 21. However Curran was pulled due to injury and he was replaced by John Macapá. He won the fight via knockout in round one.

McKee next faced Daniel Crawford at Bellator 212 on December 14, 2018. He won the fight via an anaconda choke submission in the first round.

2019
As the first bout of his new multi-bout contract, McKee's next fight came against former two-time Bellator Featherweight World Champion Pat Curran at Bellator 221 on May 11, 2019. He won the bout via unanimous decision.

Bellator Featherweight World Grand Prix
McKee faced Georgi Karakhanyan in the opening round of the Bellator Featherweight World Grand Prix on September 28 at Bellator 228. He was victorious via knockout just 8 seconds into the first round, advancing to the next round.

In the quarterfinals, McKee faced Derek Campos at Bellator 236 on December 21, 2019. He won the bout via third round submission to advance in the tournament.

In the semifinals, McKee was set to face Darrion Caldwell at Bellator 244 on June 6, 2020. However, the bout was delayed due to the COVID-19 pandemic. The bout was rescheduled and took place at Bellator 253 on November 19. McKee won the fight via neck crank submission in round one, thus moving on to the Featherweight Grand Prix final.

In the final, McKee faced Bellator Featherweight Champion Patrício Pitbull at Bellator 263 on July 31, 2021 for the Grand Prix Title and $1 million dollar prize. McKee stunned Pitbull with a high kick early in the bout, and secured a guillotine choke winning the bout via submission in round one, claiming the Bellator Featherweight Championship, and $1 million dollar prize in the process. The bout marked McKee's last of his prevailing contract, but becoming the champion triggered a clause which extended the contract by one year or three fights.

Bellator Featherweight World Champion 
As the first title defense of his reign, McKee rematched Patrício Pitbull on April 15, 2022 at Bellator 277. He lost the close bout and the title via unanimous decision, marking the first defeat of his professional career.

Lightweight Move 
Moving up to Lightweight for the first time in his career, McKee faced Spike Carlyle on October 1, 2022 at Bellator 286. At weigh ins, Carlyle missed weight, coming .6 pounds over the division non-title fight limit at 156.6 lbs and was fined 20% of his purse and the bout continued at catchweight. In a wild and bloody bout, McKee came out of it with an unanimous decision victory.

McKee faced reigning Rizin FF Lightweight Champion Roberto de Souza in a non-title bout at Bellator MMA vs. Rizin on December 31, 2022. Although there were many submission attempts made by de Souza, McKee had more offense and won the bout by unanimous decision. Subsequently – with one bout left on his prevailing contract – McKee signed a new six-fight, multi-year contract with Bellator.

Lightweight Grand Prix 
On January 11, 2023, McKee was announced as one of the eight participants in the $1 million Lightweight Grand Prix.

Championships and accomplishments
Bellator MMA
Bellator Featherweight World Championship (One time; former)
Bellator Featherweight World Grand Prix Winner
Most consecutive victories in Bellator MMA history (18)
Most submission wins in Bellator Featherweight history (7)
Most stoppage victories in Bellator Featherweight division history (13)
Tied (with Patrício Freire and Michael Chandler) for the most stoppage victories in Bellator history (13)
Tied (with Aaron Pico) for second most knockout victories in Bellator Featherweight division history (6)
MMAjunkie.com
2020 November Submission of the Month 
2020 Submission of the Year 
2021 July Submission of the Month 
MMA Fighting
2020 "Submission of the Year"  vs. Darrion Caldwell 
MMAmania.com
2020 "Submission of the Year"  vs. Darrion Caldwell
CombatPress.com
2020 "Submission of the Year"  vs. Darrion Caldwell
Cageside Press
2020 "Submission of the Year"  vs. Darrion Caldwell, tied with Khabib Nurmagomedov and Aljamain Sterling
Sherdog
2020 Submission of the Year vs. Darrion Caldwell
Jitsmagazine
2020 MMA Submission of the Year vs. Darrion Caldwell

Mixed martial arts record

|-
|Win
|align=center| 20–1
|Roberto de Souza
|Decision (unanimous)
|Bellator MMA vs. Rizin
|
|align=center| 3
|align=center| 5:00
|Saitama, Japan
|
|-
|Win
|align=center|19–1
|Spike Carlyle
|Decision (unanimous)
|Bellator 286
|
|align=center|3
|align=center|5:00
|Long Beach, California, United States
|
|-
|Loss
|align=center|18–1
|Patrício Pitbull
|Decision (unanimous)
|Bellator 277
|
|align=center|5
|align=center|5:00
|San Jose, California, United States
|
|-
|Win
|align=center|18–0
|Patrício Pitbull
|Technical Submission (guillotine choke)
|Bellator 263
|
|align=center|1
|align=center|1:57
|Inglewood, California, United States
|
|-
|Win
|align=center|17–0
|Darrion Caldwell
|Submission (neck crank)
|Bellator 253
|
|align=center|1
|align=center|1:11
|Uncasville, Connecticut, United States
|
|-
|Win
|align=center|16–0
|Derek Campos
|Submission (armbar)
|Bellator 236
|
|align=center|3
|align=center|1:08
|Honolulu, Hawaii, United States
|
|-
|Win
|align=center|15–0
|Georgi Karakhanyan 
|KO (punches)
|Bellator 228
|
|align=center|1
|align=center|0:08
|Inglewood, California, United States
|
|-
|Win
|align=center|14–0
|Pat Curran
|Decision (unanimous)
|Bellator 221
|
|align=center|3
|align=center|5:00
|Rosemont, Illinois, United States
|
|-
|Win
|align=center|13–0
|Daniel Crawford
|Submission (anaconda choke)
|Bellator 212
|
|align=center|1
|align=center|3:19
|Honolulu, Hawaii, United States 
|
|-
|Win
|align=center|12–0
|John Macapá
|KO (punch)
|Bellator 205
|
|align=center|1
|align=center|1:09
|Boise, Idaho, United States
|
|-
|Win
|align=center|11–0
|Justin Lawrence
|Decision (unanimous)
|Bellator 197
|
|align=center|3
|align=center|5:00
|St. Charles, Missouri, United States
|
|-
|Win
|align=center|10–0
|Brian Moore
|Technical Submission (rear-naked choke)
|Bellator 187
|
|align=center|3
|align=center|0:42
|Dublin, Ireland
|
|-
|Win
|align=center|9–0
|Blair Tugman
|Decision (unanimous)
|Bellator 182
|
|align=center|3
|align=center|5:00
|Verona, New York, United States
|
|-
| Win
| align=center|8–0
|Dominic Mazzotta
|KO (head kick)
| Bellator 178
| 
| align=center| 1
| align=center| 1:15
| Uncasville, Connecticut, United States
|
|-
| Win
| align=center|7–0
|Brandon Phillips
|Decision (unanimous)
| Bellator 171
| 
| align=center| 3
| align=center| 5:00
| Mulvane, Kansas, United States
|
|-
| Win
| align=center|6–0
|Ray Wood
|Decision (unanimous)
| Bellator 166
| 
| align=center| 3
| align=center| 5:00
| Thackerville, Oklahoma, United States
|
|-
| Win
| align=center|5–0
|Cody Walker
|Submission (guillotine choke)
| Bellator 160
| 
| align=center| 2
| align=center| 0:32
| Anaheim, California, United States
|
|-
| Win
| align=center|4–0
|Danilo Belluardo
|TKO (punches)
| Bellator 152
| 
| align=center| 1
| align=center| 2:44
| Torino, Italy
|
|-
|Win
|align=center|3–0
|J.T. Donaldson
|KO (knee)
|Bellator 147
|
|align=center|1
|align=center|3:19
|San Jose, California, United States
|
|-
|Win
|align=center|2–0
|James Barnes
|KO (punch)
|Bellator 141
|
|align=center|1
|align=center|1:42
|Temecula, California, United States
|
|-
|Win
|align=center|1–0
|Marcos Bonilla
|Submission (rear-naked choke)
|Bellator 136
|
|align=center|1
|align=center|2:08
|Irvine, California, United States
|

See also
 List of current Bellator fighters

References

External links
 
 

1995 births
Living people
American male mixed martial artists
Featherweight mixed martial artists
Mixed martial artists utilizing wrestling
Bellator male fighters
Mixed martial artists from California
American male sport wrestlers
Amateur wrestlers
Sportspeople from Long Beach, California